Jefferson Township is the name of 7 townships in the U.S. state of Kansas:

 Jefferson Township, Chautauqua County, Kansas
 Jefferson Township, Dickinson County, Kansas
 Jefferson Township, Geary County, Kansas
 Jefferson Township, Jackson County, Kansas
 Jefferson Township, Jefferson County, Kansas
 Jefferson Township, Rawlins County
 Jefferson Township, Republic County

See also 
 Jefferson Township (disambiguation)

Kansas township disambiguation pages